"I Love You" is a song and single written by Carl Davis, Eugene Record and Barbara Acklin and performed by American soul singer, Otis Leavill. Record and Acklin also provided backing vocals. At the time of the recording, Leavill was vice-president of Dakar Records, the label upon which the song was released.

Chart performance 
It was first released in 1969 in America and reached 10 on the R&B chart and 63 on the Billboard Hot 100 in January 1970. Allmusic.com described Leavill's rendition as "imitating Record, the Chi-lites' lead singer". It was released on Atlantic in the UK in 1970 but failed to chart.

References

1969 songs
1970 songs
Songs written by Barbara Acklin
Songs written by Eugene Record